Een-West is a hamlet in the Netherlands. It is part of the Noordenveld municipality in Drenthe.

Een-West is a statistical entity, and has its own postal code. however it is considered part of Een and outside the build-up area. The area used to be close to uninhabited, but had a strategic value. Later the sconce deteriorated and the area became part of Drenthe. The sconce was restored in 1980. In 1928, a little church was built in Een-west.

References

Populated places in Drenthe
Noordenveld